Santo Stefano alla Lizza is a Baroque style, Roman Catholic church located on Via dei Gazzani, in the city of Siena, region of Tuscany, Italy. It belongs to the Roman Catholic Archdiocese of Siena-Colle di Val d'Elsa-Montalcino.

Overview

A Romanesque style building documented to exist since the 12th-century, was reconstructed in 1671–75. The façade is crowned with a tympanum with an oculus, and preceded by a flight of stairs in brick. The interior once housed a Madonna with child and Saints by Andrea Vanni and a complete predella by Giovanni di Paolo (six scenes from the Life of St Stephen with a central Crucifixion with Saints Jerome and Bernard), now in the Baptistery of Siena. On the right altar was a Visitation by Rutilio Manetti (also in now kept in the Baptistery). The apse has a fragmentary Deposition by Antonio Buonfigli.

Literature
Toscana. Guida d'Italia (Red guide), Touring Club Italiano, Milan 2003.

References

Roman Catholic churches in Siena
12th-century Roman Catholic church buildings in Italy
Baroque architecture in Siena